Nikolay Ivanovich "Kola" Beldy (2 May 1929 – 21 December 1993) was a Soviet-Russian pop singer of Nanai ethnicity.

Early years
Kola Beldy was born in the Khabarovsk Territory in the family of a hunter. He orphaned early.

During the Great Patriotic War, he escaped through Khabarovsk to the front, attributing to himself two extra years, and became a cabin boy of the Pacific Fleet. Participated in combat operations in Korea. He performed in the Song and Dance Ensemble of the Pacific Fleet. After graduating from an external music school, Beldy continued his service as a diesel engine driver on a minesweeper of the Pacific Fleet

Popularity
In 1957, he became a laureate of the 6th World Festival of Youth and Students in Moscow. In 1960, he became a laureate of the All-Russian competition of pop artists.
In 1986, he was awarded the title of Meritorious Artist of the RSFSR. He had a number of Soviet-era hits, most famously "Увезу тебя я в тундру" (I will take you to the tundra). He was signed to Melodiya Moscow, in 1973 winning them Award no. 2 at the Sopot International Song Festival.

Since the 1970s, Beldy has been engaged in research work — collecting and preserving unique national songs of the Northern people. Having failed to audition for the main role in the film "Dersu Uzala" directed by Akira Kurosawa and Vladimir Vasiliev, he helped Kurosawa to select national melodies, and also rehearsed with the performer of the main role Maxim Munzuk. For more than 30 years, Cola Beldy has toured the country and abroad, performed in 46 countries around the world.

In the late 80s, he released the album "White Island" with interpretations of folk songs of the indigenous inhabitants of the North in Russian; according to critic Alexander Gorbachev, "this gloomy electronics mixed with ethnic motifs creates a wild and mysterious atmosphere, akin to that which arises when listening to Western bands that participated in the industrial movement, but with taiga notes." In the mid-80's Beldy also took part in the stage experiments of the Pop-Mechanics project.

Legacy
According to musicologist and rock critic Artemy Troitsky he "scored with some tundra-orientated megahits in the seventies and is considered a hallmark of Soviet snow-opera kitsch". According to Konstantin Bogdanov, Kola Beldy, "although he was a Nanai by nationality, played with visible pleasure in public the already established features of the so-called Chukchi accent and liked to tell jokes about the Chukchi. And he positioned on the stage exactly the image that was related not to the ethnographic, but to the quite imaginary — "folklore" — reality of the Soviet Union"

The ship "Meteor" of the Amur River Shipping Company was named "Kola Beldy". In Khabarovsk, in one of the new microdistricts there is a Kola Beldy Street. A street in the administrative center of the Nanai district, the village of Troitskoye, is also named in his honor.

Discography
EPs
 1971 — Кола Бельды (lit. "Kola Beldy")
Studio albums
 1973 — Поёт Кола Бельды (lit. "Poyot Kola Beldy")
 1982 — Хейдже (Здравица) (lit. "Heige (Zdravitsa)")
 1985 — Приди, весна (lit. "Pridi, vesna")
 1988 — White Island

References

External links
 
A 1972 performance on the Gosteleradiofond YouTube channel.

1929 births
1993 deaths
Russian pop singers
20th-century Russian singers
Nanai people
20th-century Russian male singers